Baccha elongata is a species of hoverfly (or flower fly) in the genus Baccha.

Distribution and habitat
Baccha elongata is present in most of Europe and in North America. Common and widely distributed throughout Britain and Ireland wherever there is suitable habitat though easily overlooked due to its unobtrusive nature. These hoverflies inhabit coniferous and deciduous forests, woodland, hedgerows, scrub and gardens Generally they prefer shady places low to the ground.

Description

It is one of the smaller hoverflies, the wing length is around 4.5 to 8 mm.

The long, very slender body of these hoverflies is unmistakable. They also differ from other hoverflies by their elongated, thin abdomen ending in club. This club-shaped abdomen is black with a yellow spot on the 3rd and 4th segments. Legs are brownish yellow. Forehead is brightly hairy.

Members of the eristaline genus Sphegina are also very slender and can be found in similar habitat but those flies have a rather different enlarged hind femur, whereas in Baccha this feature is slender. As with most hoverfly species the sexes can be told apart by the male's eyes meeting on the top of the head, but separated in the female.

This species is very similar to Baccha obscuripennis Meigen, 1822.

Biology
Adults can be seen on the wing from spring until autumn, in two generations (April/June and July/September or October). They mainly feed on pollen and nectar of Compositae, Rosaceae (Alchemilla xanthochlora), Apiaceae (Angelica sylvestris, Heracleum sphondylium) and  Hedera species.

As with most other members of the subfamily Syrphinae the larvae are predatory though there seems to be a preference for a variety of different ground-layer aphids. This species overwinters as a larva.

Bibliography

References

Muscomorph flies of Europe
Diptera of North America
Hoverflies of North America
Syrphinae
Insects described in 1775
Articles containing video clips